The UnitingCare Connections Building is a contemporary office, located at 53 Webb Street, Narre Warren, Victoria, Australia. It is in close proximity to Fountain Gate Shopping Centre, and the town centre of the Narre Warren. The property occupies 3 parcels of land with a combined area of 5267m2 and was previously the Narre Warren Primary School, circa 1950. The building was designed by Harmer Architecture and construction was completed between 2006 and 2007. The building was designed for Connections, an agency of UnitingCare that is involved in social welfare programs. UnitingCare provides youth services for Narre Warren and surrounding areas.

Description 

The UnitingCare Connections building designed by Harmer Architecture incorporates white brick for construction of the perimeter walls and yellow brick for the front section of the building. Other parts of the building were constructed with the use of aluminium sheeting or galvanized iron cladding such as alucobond for the façade. The awnings located on the back are constructed with modulated perforated metal external sun screens. The use of skillion roof for the front portion of the building is apparent in the overall form of the design. The work spaces of the building are organized towards the back of the building with the separation of four different sized rooms to accommodate for the size of the work teams and assembly. These open work spaces are naturally ventilated, receive light from the north, and look out onto a view of the landscape. The faceted North wall takes advantage of the site slope so that the interior does not appear confined but rather relates more closely to the landscape setting in which it is placed.

The current Connections facilities at Narre Warren is located in a collection of pre-existing school buildings scattered throughout the site. The size of the main weatherboard building is 450m2 and it has a staggered building footprint. This Connections facilities building is newly constructed and sits amongst a portable classroom, a galvanised iron clad shed and a galvanised iron clad garage on the site.

Design Approach 

Prior to construction, the Narre Warren office lacked a strong street presence, with car parking dominating the Webb Street frontage. The addition of a new Administration Building provided an opportunity to strengthen the community link already established by the work of Connections in the area. 

The aim was to provide an efficient and safe workplace, and a welcoming and accessible facility for visitors to the site. The following is a list of design aims that were considered:

	        Incorporate environmentally sustainable design principles
		Maximise northern orientation to reduce energy costs
		Flexibility of design for future needs
		Minimise cost of roadways
		Maximise landscaping to increase site amenity
		Create possibilities for external recreation/play areas
		Maximise site security and accessibility
		Create clearly defined vehicular drop off
	        Maximise street presence for both UCC and commercial development
		Minimise existing tree removal
		Maximise area of commercial building to increase earning potential

Gallery

References

External links 
Harmer Architecture
Map

Office buildings in Melbourne